The following lists events that happened during 1906 in the Congo Free State.

Incumbent
 King – Leopold II of Belgium
 Governor-general – Théophile Wahis

Events

See also

 Congo Free State
 History of the Democratic Republic of the Congo

References

Sources

 
Congo Free State
Congo Free State